Hilarographa uluana is a species of moth of the family Tortricidae. It is found in Brunei.

The wingspan is about 12 mm. The ground colour of the forewings is whitish in form of eight transverse lines extending from the dorsum parallelly. The hindwings are grey tinged brownish.

Etymology
The name refers to the type locality, Ulu in Brunei.

References

Moths described in 2009
Hilarographini